Isak Holger Erbén (15 October 1915 – 19 August 1975) was a Swedish sports shooter. He competed in the 300 m rifle, three positions, at the 1948 and 1952 Summer Olympics and placed eighth and seventh, respectively.

References

External links
 

1915 births
1975 deaths
Swedish male sport shooters
Olympic shooters of Sweden
Shooters at the 1948 Summer Olympics
Shooters at the 1952 Summer Olympics
People from Eskilstuna
Sportspeople from Södermanland County
20th-century Swedish people